The Agaricomycotina is one of three subdivisions of the Basidiomycota (fungi bearing spores on basidia). The Agaricomycotina contains over 30000  species, divided into 4 classes. Around 98% of species are in the class Agaricomycetes including all the agarics (gilled mushrooms), bracket fungi, clavarioid fungi, corticioid fungi, and gasteroid fungi. The Tremellomycetes contain many basidiomycetous yeasts and some conspicuous jelly fungi. The Dacrymycetes contain a further group of jelly fungi, while the Bartheletiomycetes comprise a single anomalous species on fallen leaves of Ginkgo biloba. All these taxa are founded on molecular research, based on cladistic analysis of DNA sequences, and supersede earlier morphology-based classifications.

References

External links

Tree of Life Agaricomycotina
Hymenomycetes at the Tree of Life Web Project
https://www.tandfonline.com/doi/full/10.1080/15572536.2006.11832621